Fokus is a Danish political party.

Fokus may also refer to:
Fokus (Luxembourg), a Luxembourgish political party
Fokus (magazine), a Swedish-language weekly news and current affairs magazine
Fokus (newspaper), a weekly newspaper from North Macedonia
Fokus (TV program), an Indonesian television news program

See also
Focus (disambiguation)